In breakdancing, toprock is foot movement performed while standing, serving as the opening display of style, and as a warm-up for transitions into the more acrobatic maneuvers of downrock. It allows the dancer to demonstrate coordination, flexibility, rhythm and style. Breakers may devote considerable time to developing their toprock, and the style they display is a point of pride. 

Toprocking is a style of dance in and of itself.  However, toprocking is very open to modification for individual style. For this reason, it has come to incorporate elements of salsa, Lindy Hop, Liquid dancing and the Robot. In particular, uprock, often confused with "toprock," is a competitively-oriented type of dance consisting of foot shuffles, spins, turns, and creative movements that may mimic combat.

Common toprock steps include the Indian step, Bronx step, Charlie rock, hip twist, kick step and side step.

References

See also
Freeze (b-boy move)

Breakdance moves
Funk dance